Nanny state is a term of British origin that conveys a view that a government or its policies are overprotective or interfering unduly with personal choice. The term likens such a government to the role that a nanny has in child rearing. An early use of the term comes from Conservative British Member of Parliament Iain Macleod who referred to "what I like to call the nanny state" in the 3 December 1965 edition of The Spectator.

The term was popularised by journalists Bernard Levin and Auberon Waugh and later by Prime Minister Margaret Thatcher.

Uses of term

Australia
The term has been used to describe the policies of both federal and state governments. Canadian journalist and magazine publisher Tyler Brûlé argued that Australian cities were becoming over-sanitised and the country was on the verge of becoming the world's dumbest nation. This was blamed on the removal of personal responsibility and the increase in the number and scope of health and safety laws. Liberal Democrats senator David Leyonhjelm also used the term when launching an Australian Senate enquiry into laws and regulations that restrict personal choice "for the individual's own good". The term has also been used to criticise mandatory bicycle helmet laws, gun control laws, prohibitions on alcohol in public places, plain packaging for cigarettes and pub/club lockout laws.

New Zealand
The term was used by the New Zealand National Party to describe the policies of their political opponents, the Fifth Labour Government, who were in power from 1999 until 2008. In turn, the child policies of the National Party's Paula Bennett were later given the 'nanny state' label by a Māori Community Law Service manager in 2012. In 2017, the Queenstown Lakes District Council's proposed restrictions on residents renting their rooms on the short term rental site, Airbnb, prompted criticism by the company, which described the move as "nanny-state".

Singapore
The city state of Singapore has a reputation as a nanny state, owing to the considerable number of government regulations and restrictions on its citizens' lives. Former Prime Minister Lee Kuan Yew, the architect of the modern Singapore, observed: "If Singapore is a nanny state, then I am proud to have fostered one". In an interview in the Straits Times in 1987, Lee said:

I am often accused of interfering in the private lives of citizens. Yes, if I did not, had I not done that, we wouldn’t be here today. And I say without the slightest remorse, that we wouldn’t be here, we would not have made economic progress, if we had not intervened on very personal matters–who your neighbour is, how you live, the noise you make, how you spit, or what language you use. We decide what is right. Never mind what the people think.

United Kingdom
In 1980, Lord Balfour of Inchrye strongly opposed the introduction of seatbelt legislation, saying it was "yet another state narrowing of individual freedom and individual responsibility". He worried that future intrusions of the "nanny state" would include restrictions on cigarettes, alcohol, and mandatory life jackets.

In 2004, King's Fund, a think tank, conducted a survey of more than 1,000 people and found that most favoured policies that combatted behaviour such as eating a poor diet and public smokingthis was reported by the BBC as the public favouring a nanny state.

The British Labour Party politician Margaret Hodge has defended policies she acknowledged had been labelled as "nanny state", saying at a speech to the Institute for Public Policy Research on November 26, 2004 that "some may call it the nanny state but I call it a force for good".

The "Soft Drinks Industry Levy", the UK's sugary drink tax proposed in 2016 and effective from 2018, was described by Member of Parliament Will Quince as "patronizing, regressive and the nanny state at its worst".

United States
By the 2000s, the term entered use in the United States by some political commentators. The term was used in an at-large sense against the legislative tendencies of liberal political ideology such as in the banishment of smoking in public places or the enactment of mandatory bicycle helmet laws.

In 2012, a proposal by New York City Mayor Michael Bloomberg to restrict the sale of soft drinks in venues, restaurants, and sidewalk carts to 16 ounces led to the occasional derision of the mayor as "Nanny Bloomberg."

David Harsanyi has also used the term to describe food labeling regulations, the legal drinking age, and socially conservative government policies.

Conversely, Dean Baker of the Center for Economic and Policy Research think tank used the term in 2006 to describe conservative policies that protect the income of the rich.

China
In September 2021, the Washington Post editorial board decried "dictatorships" that "impose decisions about what people can see, hear and — to the extent the regimes can manage it — think." Xi Jinping, as General Secretary of the Chinese Communist Party and President of the People's Republic of China, the board wrote, is "pushing the nanny state into people’s personal lives" with regulations on, among other matters, online gaming among the country's teenagers. "Not many [parents]," the board argued, "want to cede parenting decisions to an authoritarian party-state."

See also
Big government
Criticisms of welfare
Economic interventionism
Involuntary unemployment
Hamburger problem
Managerial state 
Moonbat
Paternalism
Redwashing
Totalitarianism
Welfare state

References

Further reading
 
 
 
 
 
 
 
 Basham, Patrick. "From the nanny state to the bully state." Institute of Public Affairs Review: A Quarterly Review of Politics and Public Affairs, The 62.1 (2010): 24.

Criticisms of welfare
Pejorative terms for forms of government
Conservatism
Conservatism in the United States
Conservatism in the United Kingdom
Libertarian terms
Social engineering (political science)
1960s neologisms